Carrizo ("reed") is the Spanish vernacular name of the following plants found in a carrizal ("reed bed"):

 Ammophila arenaria
 Arundo donax
 Elytrigia repens
 Phragmites australis